390° of Simulated Stereo is a live album featuring recordings from Pere Ubu's first few years of existence.  In general, the recordings featured are lo-fi in nature.  The album was out of print for decades, but will be reissued for Record Store Day 2021.

Track listing
"Non-alignment Pact"  – 3:45
"Street Waves"  – 4:08
"Real World"  – 4:05
"My Dark Ages"  – 5:32
"Modern Dance"  – 3:33
"Humor Me"  – 2:44
"Heart of Darkness"  – 4:07
"Laughing"  – 5:15
"Can't Believe It"  – 2:16
"Over My Head"  – 4:46
"Sentimental Journey"  – 4:53
"30 Seconds Over Tokyo"  – 5:42

All songs were either taken from The Modern Dance, the group's first LP, or were among Pere Ubu's earliest singles later collected on Terminal Tower. The track listing on the CD version's rear tray card and disc label are incorrect; all the correct songs are listed but in scrambled order.

1, 8 – December 5, 1978 at College of Printing, London
2 – May 5, 1978 at Theater 140, Brussels
3, 4 –  February 18, 1978 at Disasto 2, WHK Auditorium, Cleveland
5 –  March 2, 1979 at International Garage Exhibition, Cleveland State University
6 – October 14, 1977 at Pere Ubu rehearsal loft, Cleveland
7 – December 6, 1978 at Brunel University, Uxbridge
9-11 –  May 1976 at The Mistake, Cleveland
12 – August 4, 1977 at Pirate's Cove in The Flats, Cleveland

Personnel
Pere Ubu
Tom Herman – guitar, bass, backing vocals
Peter Laughner – guitar, bass, backing vocals
Tim Wright – bass, guitar
Scott Krauss – drums
Tony Maimone – bass, backing vocals
Allen Ravenstine – EML synthesizers, saxophone
David Thomas – vocals, horn, percussion, cover design
Dave Taylor - synthesizer, organ
Technical
Pat Ryan, Paul Hamann – sound recordings

References

External links 

 NME review

Pere Ubu albums
1981 live albums
Rough Trade Records live albums
Fire Records (UK) live albums